The 1989–90 Football League season was Birmingham City Football Club's 87th in the Football League and the first in their history in which they played in the third tier of the English football league system. After a sound start to the season, with six wins from the first ten games, their results worsened, and they eventually finished in seventh position in the 24-team Third Division, three points outside the playoff places. They entered the 1989–90 FA Cup in the first round proper and lost in the third, eliminated by Oldham Athletic after a replay, and entered the League Cup at the first round and lost in the second, beaten 3-2 by West Ham United over two legs. They lost in the preliminary round of the Associate Members' Cup, a competition open to teams in the third and fourth tiers of the League.

Dennis Bailey was the club's top scorer for the season, with 20 goals in all competitions, of which 18 came in the league.

In April 1989, the club was sold to the Kumar brothers, owners of a Manchester-based fashion and leisurewear company. Dave Mackay was brought in as general manager, previous manager Garry Pendrey refused to stay on as part of Mackay's staff, and Samesh Kumar became chairman.

Football League Third Division

League table (part)

FA Cup

League Cup

Associate Members' Cup

Appearances and goals

Numbers in parentheses denote appearances as substitute.
Players with name struck through and marked  left the club during the playing season.
Players with names in italics and marked * were on loan from another club for the whole of their season with Birmingham.

See also
Birmingham City F.C. seasons

References
General
 
 
 Source for match dates, league positions and results: 
 Source for lineups, appearances, goalscorers and attendances: Matthews (2010), Complete Record, pp. 414–15, 480.

Specific

Birmingham City F.C. seasons
Birmingham City